This is the list of winners and nominees of the César Award for Best Sound (French: César du meilleur son).

Winners and nominees

1970s

1980s

1990s

2000s

2010s

2020s

See also
Academy Award for Best Sound
BAFTA Award for Best Sound
Magritte Award for Best Sound

References

External links 
  
 César Award for Best Sound at AlloCiné
 

Sound